The mistress of the robes was the senior lady in the Royal Household of the United Kingdom.
Formerly responsible for the queen consort's/regnant's clothes and jewellery (as the name implies), the post had the responsibility for arranging the rota of attendance of the ladies-in-waiting on the queen, along with various duties at state ceremonies. In modern times, the mistress of the robes was almost always a duchess. During the 17th and 18th centuries, this role often overlapped with or was replaced as first lady of the bedchamber.

In the past, whenever the queen was a queen regnant rather than a queen consort, the mistress of the robes was a political appointment, changing with the government. However, this has not been the case since the death of Queen Victoria in 1901, and Queen Elizabeth II had only had two mistresses of the robes in more than seventy years' reign. Queens dowager have their own mistresses of the robes, and in the 18th century princesses of Wales had one too.

Mistress of the robes to Mary I, 1553–1558
1553–1558: Susan Clarencieux

Mistress of the robes to Elizabeth I, 1558–1603
1559/1562–1603: Dorothy, Lady Stafford

Mistress of the robes to Anne of Denmark, 1603–1619
1603–1619: Audrey (Etheldreda), Lady Walsingham

Mistress of the robes to Henrietta Maria of France, 1625–1669
 1626–1652: Susan Feilding, Countess of Denbigh (also called First Lady of the Bedchamber)
 1653–1669: Elizabeth Fielding Boyle, Countess of Guilford

Mistress of the robes to Catherine of Braganza, 1662–1692
 1660–1692: Position vacant, replaced by a First Lady of the Bedchamber

Mistress of the robes to Mary of Modena, 1673–1688
 1673–1688: Position vacant, replaced by a First Lady of the Bedchamber

Mistress of the robes to Mary II, 1688–1694
 1688–1694: Lady Elizabeth Butler, Countess of Derby

Mistresses of the robes to Anne, Queen of Great Britain, 1704–1714
1704–1710: Sarah Churchill, Duchess of Marlborough
1710–1714: Elizabeth Seymour, Duchess of Somerset

Mistresses of the robes to Caroline of Ansbach, 1714–1737
1714–1717: Diana Beauclerk, Duchess of St Albans
1717–1723: Possibly vacant
1723–1731: Elizabeth Sackville, Duchess of Dorset
1731–1735: Henrietta Howard, Countess of Suffolk (Dowager Countess of Suffolk from 1733)
1735–1737: Position vacant

Mistresses of the robes to Augusta of Saxe-Gotha 1736–1763
1736–1745: Lady Archibald Hamilton
1745–1747: Position vacant
1747–1763: Grace Sackville, Countess of Middlesex

Mistress of the robes to Charlotte of Mecklenburg-Strelitz, 1761–1818
1761–1793: Mary Bertie, Duchess of Ancaster and Kesteven (Dowager Duchess of Ancaster and Kesteven from 1778)
1793–1818: Elizabeth Thynne, Marchioness of Bath (Dowager Marchioness of Bath from 1796)

Mistress of the robes to Caroline of Brunswick 1795–1821
1795–1808: Anne Townshend, Marchioness Townshend
1808–1817: Catherine Douglas, Baroness Glenbervie
1817–1821: Possibly vacant

Mistress of the robes to Adelaide of Saxe-Meiningen, 1830–1837
1830–1837: Catherine Osborne, Duchess of Leeds
1830 Elizabeth Gordon, Duchess of Gordon

Mistress of the robes to Queen Victoria, 1837–1901
1837–1841: Harriet Sutherland-Leveson-Gower, Duchess of Sutherland
1841–1846: Charlotte Montagu Douglas Scott, Duchess of Buccleuch and Queensberry
1846–1852: Harriet Sutherland-Leveson-Gower, Duchess of Sutherland
1852–1853: Anne Murray, Duchess of Atholl
1853–1858: Harriet Sutherland-Leveson-Gower, Duchess of Sutherland
1858–1859: Louisa Montagu, Duchess of Manchester
1859–1861: Harriet Sutherland-Leveson-Gower, Duchess of Sutherland
1861–1868: Elizabeth Wellesley, Duchess of Wellington
1868–1870: Elizabeth Campbell, Duchess of Argyll
1870–1874: Anne Sutherland-Leveson-Gower, Duchess of Sutherland
1874–1880: Elizabeth Wellesley, Duchess of Wellington
1880–1883: Elizabeth Russell, Duchess of Bedford
1883–1885: Anne Innes-Ker, Duchess of Roxburghe
1885–1886: Louisa Montagu Douglas Scott, Duchess of Buccleuch and Queensberry
1886: Position vacant
Acting mistress of the robes: Elizabeth Russell, Duchess of Bedford
1886–1892: Louisa Montagu Douglas Scott, Duchess of Buccleuch and Queensberry
1892–1895: Position vacant
Acting mistress of the robes: Anne Innes-Ker, Duchess of Roxburghe, and Anne Murray, Dowager Duchess of Atholl (jointly)
1894: Position vacant
Acting mistress of the robes: Louisa McDonnell, Countess of Antrim
1895–1901: Louisa Montagu Douglas Scott, Duchess of Buccleuch and Queensberry

Mistress of the robes to Alexandra of Denmark, 1901–1925
1901–1912: Louisa Montagu Douglas Scott, Duchess of Buccleuch and Queensberry
1913–1925: Winifred Cavendish-Bentinck, Duchess of Portland

Mistress of the robes to Mary of Teck, 1910–1953
1910–1916: Evelyn Cavendish, Duchess of Devonshire
1916–1921: Eileen Sutherland-Leveson-Gower, Duchess of Sutherland
1921–1953: Evelyn Cavendish, Duchess of Devonshire (Dowager Duchess of Devonshire from 1938)

Mistress of the robes to Elizabeth Bowes-Lyon, 1937–2002
1937–1964: Helen Percy, Duchess of Northumberland (Dowager Duchess of Northumberland from 1946)
1964–1990: Kathleen Hamilton, Duchess of Abercorn (Dowager Duchess of Abercorn from 1979)
1990–2002: Position vacant

Mistress of the robes to Elizabeth II, 1953–2022
1953–1967: Mary Cavendish, Dowager Duchess of Devonshire
1967–2021:  Fortune FitzRoy, Dowager Duchess of Grafton (Countess of Euston until 1970, Duchess of Grafton from 1970 to 2011, Dowager Duchess of Grafton from 2011)
2021–2022: Position vacant

Mistress of the robes to Camilla Shand, 2022–present
2022–present: Position vacant

See also
 Chief Court Mistress, Dutch, German, Scandinavian and Russian equivalent 
 Camarera mayor de Palacio, Spanish equivalent 
 Première dame d'honneur, French equivalent 
 Surintendante de la Maison de la Reine, French equivalent

References

Positions within the British Royal Household
Ceremonial officers in the United Kingdom